Edward G. Wilbor (September 10, 1807 in Chatham, Columbia County, New York – April 23, 1869) was an American politician from New York.

Life
He was the son of Samuel S. Wilbor and Hannah (Fitch) Wilbor. He attended the district schools and Kinderhook Academy, and became a farmer. He married Louisa Phelps, and they had several children.

He entered politics as a Whig, and ran twice unsuccessfully for the Assembly; and then became a Republican.

He was a member of the New York State Senate (11th D.) in 1866 and 1867.

He was buried at the Chatham Union Cemetery in Old Chatham, New York.

Sources
 The New York Civil List compiled by Franklin Benjamin Hough, Stephen C. Hutchins and Edgar Albert Werner (1870; pg. 444)
 Life Sketches of the State Officers, Senators, and Members of the Assembly of the State of New York, in 1867 by S. R. Harlow & H. H. Boone (pg. 80f)

See also
The Wilbor House

External links

 His portrait at US Gen Net

1807 births
1869 deaths
Republican Party New York (state) state senators
People from Chatham, New York
19th-century American politicians